Agazat Gharam (Egyptian Arabic: أجازة غرام translit: Agazet Gharam, English: Love Vacation) is a 1967 Egyptian comedy film directed by Mahmoud Zulfikar.

Synopsis 
Magdy works as an engineer at the High Dam, in Aswan and is taking a leave of absence from work to travel to Cairo and meet his family again, and plans to spend more time with his wife, Laila, who works as a doctor in a hospital, but she was all the time busy with him with her work, which is what makes him attracted in this period to talk  With his neighbor Ilham and he visits her all the time in her apartment, taking advantage of her husband's travel, and things develop between them rapidly.

Crew 

 Director: Mahmoud Zulfikar
 Writer: Mahmoud Farid
 Screenplay: Mohamed Abu Youssef and Farouk Sabry
 Producer: Saad Shanab
 Studio: Ihab El Leithy Films
 Distributor: Ihab El Leithy Films
 Music: Mounir Mourad
 Cinematography: Mahmoud Nasr

Primary cast 

 Fouad El-Mohandes as Magdy Saleh
 Shwikar as Layla
 Nagwa Fouad as Ilham
 Salah Nazmi as Sabri
 Naima Wasfi as Zahira Abdel Khaleq
 Hassan Mustafa as Ahmed
 Mohamed Shawky as the janitor
 Ragaa Sadiq as Adela

References

External links 
 Agazet Gharam on elCinema
 

1967 films
Films directed by Mahmoud Zulfikar
1960s Arabic-language films
Egyptian comedy films
Egyptian black-and-white films